Through My Eyes is singer, model Erica Baxter's debut album. It was released in April 2007 through SonyBMG. The album features Erica's debut single, "I Spy" which was written by singer, songwriter Natasha Bedingfield. Baxter co-wrote 8 of the 12 tracks. The album failed to chart on the Top 100 albums chart.

Track listing

Others
"Something Is Following Me" (Erica Baxter/Audius Mtawarira) - Unreleased album session track.
"Fly Away" (Erica Baxter/Audius Mtawarira/Passion Gold) - "I Spy" b-side.
"Paper Tiger" (Erica Baxter/Audius Mtawariria/Erin Sherlock) - "I Spy" b-side.
"I Dream of Ice Cream" (Chris Harriott, Simon Hopkinson) - was to be on The Food album.

Charts

References

2007 debut albums
Erica Packer albums